Plant cognition is the proposed cognition of plants. The study of plant cognition explores the idea that plants are capable of responding to and learning from stimuli in their surroundings in order to choose and make decisions that are most appropriate to ensure survival. Over recent years, experimental evidence for the cognitive nature of plants has grown rapidly and has revealed the extent to which plants can use senses and cognition to respond to their environments. Some researchers claim that plants process information in similar ways as animal nervous systems.

History 
The idea of cognition in plants was first explored by Charles Darwin in the late 1800s in the book The Power of Movement in Plants, co-authored with his son Francis. Using a neurological metaphor, he described the sensitivity of plant roots in proposing that the tip of roots acts like the brain of some lower animals. This involves reacting to sensation in order to determine their next movement even though plants possess neither brains nor nerves. 

Irrespective of whether this neurological metaphor is correct or, more generally, the modern application of neuroscience terminology and concepts to plants is appropriate, the Darwinian idea of the root tip of plants functioning as a "brain-like" organ (together with the so-called "root-brain hypothesis") has experienced an ongoing revival in plant physiology.

While plant "neurobiology" focuses on the physiological study of plants, modern plant cognition primarily applies a behavioural/ecological approach. Today, plant cognition is emerging as a field of research directed at experimentally testing the cognitive abilities of plants, including perception, learning processes, memory and consciousness. This framework holds considerable implications for the way we perceive plants as it redefines the traditionally held boundary between animals and plants.

Types 
The study of plant cognition stems from the idea that plants are able to learn and adapt to their environment with only a stimulus, integration, and response system. While proven that plants do indeed lack a brain and the function of a conscious working nervous system, plants are still somehow capable of adapting to their environment and changing the integration pathway that would ultimately lead to how a plant “decides” to take response to a presented stimulus. This raises issues of plant intelligence which is defined to be able to actively adapt to any stimulus presented to the species from the environment. Plants are therefore clever in sensing the environmental stimulus e.g young sunflowers that face the sun for their growth.

Plant memory 

In a study done by Monica Gagliano from the University of Western Australia’s Centre for Evolutionary Biology, Mimosa pudica (sensitive plant) was tested for habituation to repeatedly being dropped. After multiple drops, it was found that the plants eventually became habituated, opening their leaves more quickly compared to the first time they were dropped. While the mechanism of this plant behavior is still not fully understood, it is strongly linked to changes in the flux within calcium channels.

Another example of short term "memory" of a plant is found in the Venus flytrap, whose rapid closure is only triggered when at least two trap hairs are contacted within twenty seconds of one another. One hypothesis that explains how this occurs is by electrical signalling in plants. When one trap hair (mechanoreceptor) is triggered, a sub-threshold potential is reached. When two trap hairs are triggered, a threshold is reached, generating an action potential that closes the trap.

Associative learning 
In 2016, a research team led by Monica Gagliano set out to test whether plants learn to respond to predicted events in their environment. The research demonstrated that plants were capable of learning the association between the occurrence of one event and the anticipation of another event (i.e. Pavlovian learning). By experimentally demonstrating associative learning in plants, this finding qualified plants as proper subjects of cognitive research. In this study, it was hypothesized that plants have the capability to associate one type of stimulus with another. To test this hypothesis, pea plants were exposed to two different stimuli. For the training phase, one group of pea plants was exposed to both wind and light, and the other group of plants was exposed to wind without light as a control. In the experimental phase, the plants were exposed only to the wind stimulus. The pea plants that were only ever exposed to wind without light grew away from the wind in both the training and experimental phases. In contrast, the pea plants exposed to both wind and light in the training phase exhibited growth toward a wind stimulus without the presence of light, demonstrating an apparent learned association between wind and light. The mechanism for this response is not entirely understood, though it is hypothesized that sensory inputs from mechanoreceptors and photoreceptors were somehow integrated within the plants. This explains why a non-light stimulus would trigger a growth response in the trained pea plant that is typically only triggered by the activation of photoreceptors.

A replication study with a larger sample size, published in 2020, found no evidence of associative learning in pea plants. However, it also failed to replicate the finding that light functioned effectively as an unconditioned stimulus. Pea plants in this study displayed only a slight trend rather than a reliable directional growth response towards previously presented light. The replicated experimental setup differed from the original in the presence of higher levels of ambient and reflected light, which may have randomised directional growth somewhat and prevented replication.

Further research 
In 2003, Anthony Trewavas led a study to see how the roots interact with one another and study their signal transduction methods. He was able to draw similarities between water stress signals in plants affecting developmental changes and signal transductions in neural networks causing responses in muscle. Particularly, when plants are under water stress, there are abscisic acid dependent and independent effects on development. This brings to light further possibilities of plant decision-making based on its environmental stresses. The integration of multiple chemical interactions show evidence of the complexity in these root systems.

In 2012, Paco Calvo Garzón and Fred Keijzer speculated that plants exhibited structures equivalent to (1) action potentials (2) neurotransmitters and (3) synapses. Also, they stated that a large part of plant activity takes place underground, and that the notion of a 'root brain' was first mooted by Charles Darwin in 1880. Free movement was not necessarily a criterion of cognition, they held. The authors gave five conditions of minimal cognition in living beings, and concluded that 'plants are cognitive in a minimal, embodied sense that also applies to many animals and even bacteria.' In 2017 biologists from University of Birmingham announced that they found a "decision-making center" in the root tip of dormant Arabidopsis seeds.

In 2014, Anthony Trewavas released a book called Plant Behavior and Intelligence that highlighted a plant's cognition through its colonial-organization skills reflecting insect swarm behaviors. This organizational skill reflects the plant's ability to interact with its surroundings to improve its survivability, and a plant's ability to identify exterior factors. Evidence of the plant's minimal cognition of spatial awareness can be seen in their root allocation relative to neighboring plants. The organization of these roots have been found to originate from the root tip of plants.

On the other hand, Dr. Crisp and his colleagues proposed a different view on plant memory in their review: plant memory could be advantageous under recurring and predictable stress; however, resetting or forgetting about the brief period of stress may be more beneficial for plants to grow as soon as the desirable condition returns.

Affifi (2018) proposed an empirical approach to examining the ways plants model coordinate goal-based behaviour to environmental contingency as a way of understanding plant learning. According to this author, associative learning will only demonstrate intelligence if it is seen as part of teleologically integrated activity. Otherwise, it can be reduced to mechanistic explanation.

Raja et al (2020) found that potted French bean plants, when planted 30 centimetres from a garden cane, would adjust their growth patterns to enable themselves to use the cane as a support in the future. Raja later stated that "If the movement of plants is controlled and affected by objects in their vicinity, then we are talking about more complex behaviours (rather than simple) reactions". Raja proposed that researchers should look for corresponding cognitive signatures.

In 2017 Yokawa, K. et  al.  found that, when exposed to anesthetics, a number of plants lost both their autonomous and touch-induced movements. Venus flytraps no longer generate electrical signals and their traps remain open when trigger hairs were touched, and growing pea tendrils stopped their autonomous movements and were immobilized in a curled shape.

Criticism 
The idea of plant cognition is a source of controversy.

Amadeo Alpi and 35 other scientists published an article in 2007 titled “Plant Neurobiology: No brain, No gain?” in Trends in Plant Science. In this article, they argue that since there is no evidence for the presence of neurons in plants, the idea of plant neurobiology and cognition is unfounded and needs to be redefined. In response to this article, Francisco Calvo Garzón published an article in Plant Signaling and Behavior. He states that, while plants do not have "neurons" as animals do, they do possess an information-processing system composed of cells. He argues that this system can be used as a basis for discussing the cognitive abilities of plants.

See also 
 Boquila trifoliolata
 Embodied cognition
 Plant perception (physiology)
 Plantoid

References

Further reading 

 

 
Enactive cognition
Plant communication